The family Noctuidae is the largest family of macro-moths in Great Britain, where over 400 species occur:

Subfamily Noctuinae

 Euxoa obelisca grisea, square-spot dart — south, west & north-east (Nationally Scarce B)
 Euxoa tritici, white-line dart — throughout ‡*
 Euxoa nigricans, garden dart — throughout ‡*
 Euxoa cursoria, coast dart — east, west-central & north (Nationally Scarce B)
 Agrotis graslini, Woods's dart — recently (2001) discovered on Jersey
 Agrotis cinerea, light feathered rustic — south & central (Nationally Scarce B)
 Agrotis vestigialis, Archer's dart — throughout (localized)
 [Agrotis spinifera, Gregson's dart — one specimen supposedly from Isle of Man ]
 Agrotis segetum, turnip moth — throughout
 Agrotis clavis, heart and club — throughout
 Agrotis exclamationis, heart and dart — throughout
 Agrotis trux lunigera, crescent dart — south-west & west-central (localized)
 Agrotis ipsilon, dark sword-grass — immigrant
 Agrotis herzogi, Spalding's dart — rare immigrant
 Agrotis puta, shuttle-shaped dart
 Agrotis puta puta — south & central
 Agrotis puta insula — Isles of Scilly
 Agrotis ripae, sand dart — south, central & north-east (Nationally Scarce B)
 Agrotis crassa, great dart — immigrant (formerly resident)
 Agrotis deprivata — ?recent rare immigrant
 [Feltia subgothica, Gothic dart — one dubious record of this North American species]
 [Feltia subterranea, tawny shoulder — likely imported or misidentified]
 Axylia putris, flame — throughout
 Actebia praecox, Portland moth — immigrant (Nationally Scarce B)
 Actebia fennica, Eversmann's rustic — rare immigrant
 Ochropleura flammatra, black collar — rare immigrant
 Ochropleura plecta, flame shoulder — throughout
 Ochropleura leucogaster, Radford's flame shoulder — immigrant
 Standfussiana lucernea, northern rustic — south, west-central & north (localized)
 Rhyacia simulans, dotted rustic — throughout
 Rhyacia lucipeta, southern rustic — probable rare immigrant (one record)
 Noctua pronuba, large yellow underwing — throughout
 Noctua orbona, lunar yellow underwing — throughout (Nationally Scarce B)
 Noctua comes, lesser yellow underwing — throughout
 Noctua fimbriata, broad-bordered yellow underwing — throughout
 Noctua janthina, Langmaid's yellow underwing — probable rare immigrant or resident
 Noctua janthe, lesser broad-bordered yellow underwing — throughout
 Noctua interjecta caliginosa, least yellow underwing — south & central
 Spaelotis ravida, stout dart — south & east-central (localized)
 Graphiphora augur, double dart — throughout ‡*
 Eugraphe subrosea, rosy marsh moth — west-central (Red Data Book)
 Protolampra sobrina, cousin German — north (Nationally Scarce A)
 Eugnorisma glareosa, autumnal rustic — throughout ‡*
 Eugnorisma depuncta, plain clay — north, west-central & south-west (Nationally Scarce B)
 Lycophotia porphyrea, true lover's knot — throughout
 Peridroma saucia, pearly underwing — immigrant & possible transitory resident
 Diarsia mendica, ingrailed clay 
 Diarsia mendica mendica — throughout
 Diarsia mendica orkneyensis — Orkney
 Diarsia mendica thulei — Shetland
 Diarsia dahlii, barred chestnut — north, west-central & south-east (localized)
 Diarsia brunnea, purple clay — throughout
 Diarsia rubi, small square-spot — throughout ‡*
 Diarsia florida, fen square-spot — east-central, west-central & north (localized)
 Xestia alpicola alpina, northern dart — north (Nationally Scarce A)
 Xestia c-nigrum, setaceous Hebrew character — throughout
 Xestia ditrapezium, triple-spotted clay — throughout (localized)
 Xestia triangulum, double square-spot —throughout
 Xestia ashworthii, Ashworth's rustic — west-central (Nationally Scarce A)
 Xestia baja, dotted clay — throughout
 Xestia rhomboidea, square-spotted clay — throughout (Nationally Scarce B)
 Xestia castanea, neglected rustic — throughout (localized) ‡*
 Xestia sexstrigata, six-striped rustic — throughout
 Xestia xanthographa, square-spot rustic — throughout
 Xestia agathina, heath rustic ‡*
 Xestia agathina agathina — throughout (localized)
 Xestia agathina hebridicola — Hebrides
 Naenia typica, Gothic — throughout (localized)
 Eurois occulta, great brocade — immigrant (Nationally Scarce B)
 Anaplectoides prasina, green arches — throughout
 Cerastis rubricosa, red chestnut — throughout
 Cerastis leucographa, white-marked — south & central (localized)
 Mesogona acetosellae, pale stigma — rare immigrant

Subfamily Hadeninae

 Anarta myrtilli, beautiful yellow underwing — throughout
 Anarta cordigera, small dark yellow underwing — north-east (Nationally Scarce A) ‡
 Anarta melanopa, broad-bordered white underwing — north (Red Data Book)
 Discestra trifolii, nutmeg — throughout
 [Lacinipolia renigera, kidney-spotted minor — dubious old record]
 Lacinipolia laudabilis — ?recent rare immigrant
 Hada plebeja, shears — throughout
 Polia bombycina, pale shining brown — south (proposed Red Data Book)
 Polia trimaculosa, silvery arches — throughout (Nationally Scarce B)
 Polia nebulosa, grey arches — throughout
 Pachetra sagittigera britannica, feathered ear — south (presumed extinct)
 Sideridis albicolon, white colon — south, central & north-east (Nationally Scarce B)
 Heliophobus reticulata marginosa, bordered Gothic — south & east-central (proposed Red Data Book)
 Mamestra brassicae, cabbage moth — throughout
 Melanchra persicariae, dot moth — south, central & north ‡*
 Melanchra pisi, broom moth — throughout ‡*
 Lacanobia contigua, beautiful brocade — throughout (localized)
 Lacanobia w-latinum, light brocade — throughout (localized)
 Lacanobia thalassina, pale-shouldered brocade — throughout
 Lacanobia suasa, dog's tooth — south & central (localized)
 Lacanobia oleracea, bright-line brown-eye — throughout
 Lacanobia blenna, stranger — rare immigrant & temporary resident
 Papestra biren, glaucous shears — south-west, west-central & north (localized)
 Hecatera bicolorata, broad-barred white — throughout
 Hecatera dysodea, small ranunculus — south-east & south Wales
 Hadena rivularis, campion — throughout
 Hadena perplexa 
 Hadena perplexa perplexa, tawny shears — south & central 
 Hadena perplexa capsophila, pod lover — south-west, west-central, north-west & Isle of Man (localized)
 Hadena irregularis, viper's bugloss — presumed extinct
 Hadena luteago barrettii, Barrett's marbled coronet — south-west (Nationally Scarce B)
 Hadena compta, varied coronet — south-east, south & east-central 
 Hadena confusa, marbled coronet — throughout (localized)
 Hadena albimacula, white spot — south (Red Data Book)
 Hadena bicruris, lychnis — throughout
 Hadena caesia mananii, grey — north-west & Isle of Man (Red Data Book)
 Eriopygodes imbecilla, Silurian — south-west (Red Data Book)
 Cerapteryx graminis, antler — throughout
 Tholera cespitis, hedge rustic — throughout ‡*
 Tholera decimalis, feathered Gothic — throughout ‡*
 Panolis flammea, pine beauty — throughout
 [Xanthopastis timais, Spanish moth — dubious specimen]
 [Brithys crini pancratii, Kew arches — probable import]
 Egira conspicillaris, silver cloud — south-west (Nationally Scarce A)
 Orthosia cruda, small Quaker — throughout
 Orthosia miniosa, blossom underwing — south & west-central (localized) & occasional immigrant
 Orthosia opima, northern drab — throughout (localized)
 Orthosia populeti, lead-coloured drab — throughout (localized)
 Orthosia gracilis, powdered Quaker — throughout ‡*
 Orthosia cerasi, common Quaker — throughout
 Orthosia incerta, clouded drab — throughout
 Orthosia munda, twin-spotted Quaker — south, central & north
 Orthosia gothica, Hebrew character — throughout
 Mythimna turca, double line — south-west & south-east (Nationally Scarce B)
 Mythimna conigera, brown-line bright eye — throughout
 Mythimna ferrago, clay — throughout
 Mythimna albipuncta, white-point — immigrant & recent colonist (south & south-east coasts)
 Mythimna vitellina, delicate — immigrant
 Mythimna pudorina, striped wainscot — south & central (localized)
 Mythimna straminea, southern wainscot — south & central (localized)
 Mythimna impura, smoky wainscot — throughout
 Mythimna pallens, common wainscot — throughout
 Mythimna favicolor, Mathew's wainscot — south & south-east (Nationally Scarce B)
 Mythimna litoralis, shore wainscot — south, central & north-east (Nationally Scarce B)
 Mythimna l-album, l-album wainscot — immigrant to south (Nationally Scarce B)
 Mythimna unipuncta, white-speck — immigrant & possible transitory resident
 Mythimna obsoleta, obscure wainscot — south, east-central & west-central (localized)
 Mythimna comma, shoulder-striped wainscot — throughout ‡*
 Mythimna putrescens, Devonshire wainscot — south-west (Nationally Scarce A)
 [Mythimna commoides — probable import or hoax]
 Mythimna loreyi, cosmopolitan — immigrant
 Mythimna flammea, flame wainscot — south-east & south (Nationally Scarce A)
 [Graphania dives, Maori — probable import]

Subfamily Cuculliinae

 Cucullia absinthii, wormwood — south & central (Nationally Scarce B)
 [Cucullia argentea, green silver-spangled shark — two specimens of dubious origin]
 Cucullia artemisiae, scarce wormwood — rare immigrant
 Cucullia chamomillae, chamomile shark — south, central & north (localized)
 [Cucullia lactucae, lettuce shark — several dubious records]
 Cucullia umbratica, shark — throughout
 Cucullia asteris, star-wort — south & central (Nationally Scarce B)
 Cucullia gnaphalii occidentalis, cudweed — presumed extinct
 Shargacucullia lychnitis, striped lychnis — south (Nationally Scarce A)
 Shargacucullia scrophulariae, water betony — rare immigrant
 Shargacucullia verbasci, mullein — south & central 
 [Shargacucullia prenanthis, false water betony — inclusion on British list presumed in error]
 [Shargacucullia caninae — single record of caterpillars]
 Calophasia lunula, toadflax brocade — south-east (Red Data Book)
 Calophasia platyptera, antirrhinum brocade — probable rare immigrant
 Brachylomia viminalis, minor shoulder-knot — throughout ‡*
 Leucochlaena oditis, beautiful Gothic — south (Red Data Book)
 Brachionycha sphinx, sprawler — south & central ‡*
 Brachionycha nubeculosa, Rannoch sprawler — north (Red Data Book)
 Dasypolia templi, brindled ochre — north, central & south-west (localized) ‡*
 Aporophyla australis pascuea, feathered brindle — south (Nationally Scarce B)
 Aporophyla lutulenta, deep-brown dart — south & central ‡*
 Aporophyla lueneburgensis, northern deep-brown dart — north & west-central 
 Aporophyla nigra, black rustic — north, south, west-central & east-central
 Lithomoia solidaginis, golden-rod brindle — north & west-central (localized)
 [Scotochrosta pulla, ash shoulder-knot — probable fraud]
 [Copipanolis styracis, fawn sallow — probable import]
 Lithophane semibrunnea, tawny pinion — south (localized)
 Lithophane hepatica, pale pinion — south & central (localized)
 Lithophane ornitopus lactipennis, grey shoulder-knot — south & west-central 
 Lithophane furcifera, conformist
 Lithophane furcifera furcifera — immigrant
 Lithophane furcifera suffusa — presumed extinct
 Lithophane consocia — probable rare immigrant
 Lithophane lamda, nonconformist — immigrant
 Lithophane leautieri hesperica, Blair's shoulder-knot — south & central
 Xylena vetusta, red sword-grass — north, west & south (localized)
 Xylena exsoleta, sword-grass — north & central (Nationally Scarce B)
 Xylocampa areola, early grey — throughout
 Meganephria bimaculosa, double-spot brocade — possible immigrant (otherwise import)
 Allophyes oxyacanthae, green-brindled crescent — throughout ‡*
 [Valeria oleagina, green-brindled dot — dubious record]
 Dryobota labecula, oak rustic — probably rare immigrant
 Dichonia aprilina, merveille du jour — throughout
 Dryobotodes eremita, brindled green — throughout
 Blepharita satura, beautiful arches — presumed extinct
 Blepharita adusta, dark brocade — throughout ‡*
 Blepharita solieri, bedrule brocade — rare immigrant
 Antitype chi, grey chi — north, central & south
 Trigonophora flammea, flame brocade — immigrant & transitory resident
 Polymixis flavicincta, large ranunculus — south & east-central (localized)
 Polymixis gemmea, cameo probable rare immigrant
 Polymixis xanthomista statices, black-banded — south-west (Nationally Scarce A)
 Polymixis lichenea, feathered ranunculus
 Polymixis lichenea lichenea — south & central (localized)
 Polymixis lichenea scillonea — Isles of Scilly

Subfamily Acronictinae

 Eupsilia transversa, satellite — throughout
 Jodia croceago, orange upperwing — formerly south (Red Data Book); now rare immigrant
 Conistra vaccinii, chestnut — throughout
 Conistra ligula, dark chestnut — south, central & north 
 Conistra rubiginea, dotted chestnut — south-west & south (Nationally Scarce B)
 Conistra erythrocephala, red-headed chestnut — rare immigrant & transitory resident
 Agrochola circellaris, brick — throughout
 Agrochola lota, red-line Quaker — throughout
 Agrochola macilenta, yellow-line Quaker — throughout
 Agrochola haematidea, southern chestnut — south & south-east (Red Data Book)
 Agrochola helvola, flounced chestnut — throughout ‡*
 Agrochola litura, brown-spot pinion — throughout ‡*
 Agrochola lychnidis, beaded chestnut — south, central & north ‡*
 Atethmia centrago, centre-barred sallow — throughout ‡*
 Omphaloscelis lunosa, lunar underwing — throughout
 Xanthia citrago, orange sallow — throughout
 Xanthia aurago, barred sallow — south, central & north
 Xanthia togata, pink-barred sallow — throughout
 Xanthia icteritia, sallow — throughout ‡*
 Xanthia gilvago, dusky-lemon sallow — south, central & north (localized) ‡*
 Xanthia ocellaris, pale-lemon sallow — south-east (Nationally Scarce A)
 Moma alpium, scarce merveille du jour — south (Red Data Book)
 Acronicta megacephala, poplar grey — throughout
 Acronicta aceris, sycamore — south & east-central (localized)
 Acronicta leporina, miller — throughout
 Acronicta alni, alder moth — south & central (localized)
 [Acronicta cuspis, large dagger — unconfirmed record]
 Acronicta tridens, dark dagger — south, central & north 
 Acronicta psi, grey dagger — throughout ‡*
 Acronicta strigosa, marsh dagger — rare immigrant (formerly resident)
 Acronicta menyanthidis, light knot grass 
 Acronicta menyanthidis menyanthidis — north, west & east-central (localized)
 Acronicta menyanthidis scotica — north (localized)
 Acronicta auricoma, scarce dagger — rare immigrant (formerly resident)
 Acronicta euphorbiae myricae, sweet gale moth — north (Nationally Scarce A)
 Acronicta rumicis, knot grass — throughout ‡*
 Simyra albovenosa, reed dagger — south-east (Nationally Scarce B)
 Craniophora ligustri, coronet — throughout (localized)

Subfamily Bryophilinae

 Cryphia algae, tree-lichen beauty — immigrant
 Cryphia domestica, marbled beauty — throughout
 Cryphia raptricula, marbled grey — immigrant
 Cryphia muralis, marbled green — south (localized)

Subfamily Amphipyrinae

 Amphipyra pyramidea, copper underwing — south, central & north 
 Amphipyra berbera svenssoni, Svensson's copper underwing — south & central 
 Amphipyra tragopoginis, mouse moth — throughout ‡*
 Mormo maura, old lady — throughout (localized)
 Dypterygia scabriuscula, bird's wing — south-east & west-central (localized)
 Rusina ferruginea, brown rustic — throughout
 Thalpophila matura, straw underwing — south, central & north 
 Trachea atriplicis, orache moth — rare immigrant (formerly resident)
 Euplexia lucipara, small angle shades — throughout
 Phlogophora meticulosa, angle shades — throughout
 Actinotia polyodon, purple cloud — immigrant
 Actinotia hyperici, pale-shouldered cloud — rare immigrant
 Pseudenargia ulicis, Berber — probable rare immigrant (one record)
 Callopistria juventina, Latin — rare immigrant
 [Callopistria latreillei — one recorded caterpillar of uncertain origin]
 [Eucarta amethystina, Cumberland gem — unconfirmed record]
 Ipimorpha retusa, double kidney — south & central (localized)
 Ipimorpha subtusa, olive — south, central & north (localized)
 Enargia paleacea, angle-striped sallow — probable immigrant to central & north (Nationally Scarce B)
 Parastichtis suspecta, suspected — throughout
 Parastichtis ypsillon, dingy shears — south, central & north (localized)
 Dicycla oo, heart moth — south (Red Data Book)
 Cosmia affinis, lesser-spotted pinion — south & central (localized)
 Cosmia diffinis, white-spotted pinion — south & central (proposed Red Data Book)
 Cosmia trapezina, dun-bar — throughout
 Cosmia pyralina, lunar-spotted pinion — south & central (localized)
 Hyppa rectilinea, Saxon — north (Nationally Scarce B)
 Apamea monoglypha, dark arches — throughout
 Apamea lithoxylaea, light arches — throughout
 Apamea sublustris, reddish light arches — south & central (localized)
 Apamea zeta 
 Apamea zeta assimilis, northern arches — north (Nationally Scarce A)
 Apamea zeta marmorata, exile — Shetland
 Apamea oblonga, crescent striped — south & central (Nationally Scarce B)
 Apamea crenata, clouded-bordered brindle — throughout
 Apamea epomidion, clouded brindle — south, central & north 
 Apamea lateritia, scarce brindle — immigrant
 Apamea furva britannica, confused — north, west & south (localized)
 Apamea remissa, dusky brocade — throughout ‡*
 Apamea unanimis, small clouded brindle — south, central & north 
 Apamea anceps, large nutmeg — south & central (localized) ‡*
 Apamea sordens, rustic shoulder-knot — throughout
 Apamea scolopacina, slender brindle — south & central 
 Apamea ophiogramma, double lobed — throughout
 Eremobina pabulatricula, union rustic — extinct
 Oligia strigilis, marbled minor — throughout
 Oligia versicolor, rufous minor — south, central & north (localized)
 Oligia latruncula, tawny marbled minor — south, central & north 
 Oligia fasciuncula, middle-barred minor — throughout
 Mesoligia furuncula, cloaked minor — throughout
 Mesoligia literosa, rosy minor — throughout ‡*
 Mesapamea secalis, common rustic — throughout
 Mesapamea didyma, lesser common rustic — throughout
 Mesapamea remmi, Remm's rustic — south & central (?north) — status as a valid species uncertain
 Photedes captiuncula expolita, least minor — central (Red Data Book)
 Photedes minima, small dotted buff — throughout
 Chortodes morrisii
 Chortodes morrisii morrisii, Morris's wainscot — south-west (Red Data Book)
 Chortodes morrisii bondii, Bond's wainscot — south-east (Red Data Book; probably extinct)
 Chortodes extrema, concolorous — south-east & east-central (Red Data Book) ‡
 Chortodes elymi, lyme grass — east (Nationally Scarce B)
 Chortodes fluxa, mere wainscot — east-central & south (Nationally Scarce B)
 Chortodes pygmina, small wainscot — throughout
 Chortodes brevilinea, Fenn's wainscot — east (Red Data Book) ‡
 Eremobia ochroleuca, dusky sallow — south & east-central 
 Luperina testacea, flounced rustic — throughout
 Luperina nickerlii, sandhill rustic ‡
 Luperina nickerlii demuthi — south-east (Nationally Scarce A)
 Luperina nickerlii leechi — south-west (Red Data Book)
 Luperina nickerlii gueneei — west-central (Red Data Book)
 Luperina dumerilii, Dumeril's rustic — immigrant
 Luperina zollikoferi, scarce arches — immigrant
 Amphipoea lucens, large ear — south-west, west-central & north (localized)
 Amphipoea fucosa paludis, saltern ear — south, central & north-west (localized)
 Amphipoea crinanensis, crinan ear — west, central & north (localized)
 Amphipoea oculea, ear moth — throughout ‡*
 Hydraecia micacea, rosy rustic — throughout ‡*
 Hydraecia petasitis, butterbur — south, central & north (localized)
 Hydraecia osseola hucherardi, marsh mallow moth — south-east (Red Data Book)
 Gortyna flavago, frosted orange — throughout
 Gortyna borelii lunata, Fisher's estuarine moth — south-east (Red Data Book)
 Celaena haworthii, Haworth's minor — central, north & south (localized) †*
 Celaena leucostigma, crescent ‡*
 Celaena leucostigma leucostigma — throughout (localized)
 Celaena leucostigma scotica — north (localized)
 Nonagria typhae, bulrush wainscot — throughout
 Archanara geminipuncta, twin-spotted wainscot — south & east-central (localized)
 Archanara dissoluta, brown-veined wainscot — south & central (localized)
 Archanara neurica, white-mantled wainscot — south-east (Red Data Book) ‡
 Archanara sparganii, Webb's wainscot — south, south-east & south-west (Nationally Scarce B)
 Archanara algae, rush wainscot — south-east & east-central (Red Data Book)
 Rhizedra lutosa, large wainscot — throughout ‡*
 Sedina buettneri, Blair's wainscot — south (Red Data Book)
 Arenostola phragmitidis, fen wainscot — south, east-central & west-central (localized)
 Oria musculosa, Brighton wainscot — south (proposed Red Data Book)
 Coenobia rufa, small rufous — south, central & north (localized)
 Charanyca trigrammica, treble lines — south & central
 Hoplodrina alsines, uncertain — throughout
 Hoplodrina blanda, rustic — throughout ‡*
 Hoplodrina superstes, powdered rustic — rare immigrant
 Hoplodrina ambigua, Vine's rustic — south & central
 Spodoptera exigua, small mottled willow — immigrant
 Spodoptera littoralis, Mediterranean brocade — probable rare immigrant & import
 [Spodoptera litura, Asian cotton leafworm — probable import]
 [Spodoptera eridania, southern armworm — probable import]
 Spodoptera cilium, dark mottled willow — rare immigrant
 Caradrina morpheus, mottled rustic — throughout ‡*
 Platyperigea kadenii, Clancy's rustic — rare immigrant
 Paradrina flavirena, Lorimer's rustic — probable rare immigrant
 Paradrina clavipalpis, pale mottled willow — throughout
 Perigea capensis, African — probable rare immigrant
 Chilodes maritimus, silky wainscot — south & central (localized)
 Athetis pallustris, marsh moth — east-central (Red Data Book)
 Proxenus hospes, Porter's rustic — rare immigrant
 Acosmetia caliginosa, reddish buff — south (Red Data Book)
 Stilbia anomala, anomalous — south, south-west, west & north (localized) ‡*
 Elaphria venustula, rosy marbled — south-east (Nationally Scarce B)

Subfamily Stiriinae

 Synthymia fixa, goldwing — rare immigrant
 Panemeria tenebrata, small yellow underwing — south & central (localized)

Subfamily Heliothinae

 Periphanes delphinii, pease blossom — possible immigrant & import
 Pyrrhia umbra, bordered sallow — south, central & north-east (localized)
 Helicoverpa armigera, scarce bordered straw — immigrant
 Heliothis viriplaca, marbled clover — probable immigrant to south & east-central (Red Data Book)
 Heliothis maritima, shoulder-striped clover ‡
 Heliothis maritima warneckei — south (Red Data Book)
 Heliothis maritima bulgarica — rare immigrant
 Heliothis peltigera, bordered straw — immigrant
 Heliothis nubigera, eastern bordered straw — rare immigrant
 Schinia scutosa, spotted clover — immigrant

Subfamily Eustrotiinae

 Eublemma ostrina, purple marbled — immigrant
 Eublemma parva, small marbled — immigrant
 Eublemma minutata, scarce marbled — probable rare immigrant
 Protodeltote pygarga, marbled white spot — south & central
 Deltote deceptoria, pretty marbled — immigrant & transitory resident
 Deltote uncula, silver hook — south, central & north-west (localized)
 Deltote bankiana, silver barred — probable immigrant to south-east (Red Data Book)

Subfamily Acontiinae
 Emmelia trabealis, spotted sulphur — presumed extinct
 Acontia lucida, pale shoulder — immigrant
 [Acontia aprica, nun — probable import]
 [Acontia nitidula, Brixton beauty — one dubious record]

Subfamily Eariadinae
 Earias clorana, cream-bordered green pea — south & east-central (Nationally Scarce B)
 Earias biplaga, spiny bollworm — rare immigrant or import
 Earias insulana, Egyptian bollworm — probable rare immigrant & import
 [Earias vittella — imported by air on food produce]

Subfamily Chloephorinae

 Bena bicolorana, scarce silver-lines — south & central (localized)
 Pseudoips prasinana britannica, green silver-lines — throughout
 Nycteola revayana, oak nycteoline — throughout (localized)
 Nycteola asiatica, eastern nycteoline — probable rare immigrant
 Nycteola degenerana, sallow nycteoline — possible rare immigrant (otherwise import)
 [Pardasena virgulana, grey square — probable import (one record)]

Subfamily Pantheinae
 Colocasia coryli, nut-tree tussock — throughout
 [Charadra deridens, marbled tuffet — probable import]
 [Raphia frater, brother — probable import]

Subfamily Plusiinae

 Chrysodeixis chalcites, golden twin-spot — immigrant & import
 Chrysodeixis acuta, Tunbridge Wells gem — rare immigrant
 Ctenoplusia limbirena, scar bank gem — immigrant
 Ctenoplusia accentifera, accent gem — probable rare immigrant
 Trichoplusia ni, ni moth — immigrant
 Trichoplusia vittata, streaked plusia — probable rare immigrant
 Thysanoplusia orichalcea, slender burnished brass — immigrant & import
 Diachrysia chrysitis, burnished brass — throughout
 Diachrysia chryson, scarce burnished brass — south & west-central (Nationally Scarce A)
 [Pseudoplusia includens, soybean looper — probable import]
 Macdunnoughia confusa, Dewick's plusia — immigrant
 Polychrysia moneta, golden plusia — south, central & north
 [Euchalcia variabilis, purple-shaded gem — probable import]
 Plusia festucae, gold spot — throughout
 Plusia putnami gracilis, Lempke's gold spot — central, north & south (localized)

 Autographa gamma, silver Y — immigrant throughout
 Autographa pulchrina, beautiful golden Y — throughout
 Autographa jota, plain golden Y — throughout
 Autographa bractea, gold spangle — west, north & south
 Megalographa biloba, Stephens' gem — probable rare immigrant
 [Megalographa bimaculata, double-spotted spangle — single specimen of uncertain origin]
 Syngrapha interrogationis, scarce silver Y — central & north (localized)
 Cornutiplusia circumflexa, Essex Y — probable rare immigrant
 Abrostola triplasia, dark spectacle — throughout
 Abrostola tripartita, spectacle — throughout

Subfamily Catocalinae

 Catocala fraxini, Clifden nonpareil — immigrant & transitory resident
 Catocala nupta, red underwing — south & central 
 Catocala electa, rosy underwing — rare immigrant
 Catocala promissa, light crimson underwing — south (Red Data Book)
 Catocala sponsa, dark crimson underwing — south (Red Data Book)
 Catocala nymphagoga, oak yellow underwing — probable rare immigrant
 Minucia lunaris, lunar double-stripe — immigrant & transitory resident
 Clytie illunaris, Trent double-stripe — possible rare immigrant (otherwise import)
 [Caenurgina crassiuscula, double-barred — probable import]
 [Mocis trifasciata, triple-barred — one specimen of dubious origin]
 Dysgonia algira, passenger — immigrant
 Prodotis stolida, geometrician — rare immigrant
 Callistege mi, Mother Shipton — south, central & north
 Euclidia glyphica, burnet companion — south & central

Subfamily Ophiderinae

 Catephria alchymista, alchymist — immigrant
 Tyta luctuosa, four-spotted — south, central & east (Nationally Scarce A)
 [Diphthera festiva — probable import]
 Lygephila pastinum, blackneck — south & central (localized)
 Lygephila craccae, scarce blackneck — south-west (Red Data Book)
 Tathorhynchus exsiccata, Levant blackneck — rare immigrant
 [Synedoida grandirena, great kidney — probable import]
 Scoliopteryx libatrix, herald — throughout
 Phytometra viridaria, small purple-barred — throughout (localized)
 Anomis sabulifera, angled gem — possible rare immigrant (otherwise import)

Subfamily Rivulinae
 Colobochyla salicalis, lesser belle — rare immigrant (formerly resident)
 Laspeyria flexula, beautiful hook-tip — south & west-central (localized)
 Rivula sericealis, straw dot — throughout
 Parascotia fuliginaria, waved black — probable immigrant
 [Orodesma apicina — probable import]

Subfamily Hypeninae

 Hypena crassalis, beautiful snout — south & west-central (localized)
 Hypena proboscidalis, snout — throughout
 Hypena obsitalis, Bloxworth snout — south-west (Red Data Book)
 Hypena obesalis, Paignton snout — rare immigrant
 Hypena rostralis, buttoned snout — south (Nationally Scarce B)
 [Plathypena scabra, black snout — probable import]

Subfamily Strepsimananiae

 Schrankia taenialis, white-line snout — south (Nationally Scarce B)
 Schrankia intermedialis, autumnal snout — south-east — probable hybrid
 Schrankia costaestrigalis, pinion-streaked snout — south, central & north-west (localized)
 Hypenodes humidalis, marsh oblique-barred — throughout (Nationally Scarce B)
 [Idia aemula, waved tabby — two specimens of unknown origin]
 [Idia lubricalis, twin-striped tabby — two specimens of unknown origin]

Subfamily Herminiinae

 Pechipogo strigilata, common fan-foot — south (Nationally Scarce A)
 Pechipogo plumigeralis, plumed fan-foot — rare immigrant
 Zanclognatha tarsipennalis, fan-foot — throughout
 Zanclognatha lunalis, jubilee fan-foot — rare immigrant
 Herminia tarsicrinalis, shaded fan-foot — south-east (Red Data Book)
 Zanclognatha zelleralis, dusky fan-foot — possible very rare immigrant
 Herminia grisealis, small fan-foot — throughout
 Macrochilo cribrumalis, dotted fan-foot — south-east (Nationally Scarce B)
 Paracolax tristalis, clay fan-foot — immigrant to south-east (Nationally Scarce A)
 Trisateles emortualis, olive crescent — south-east (Red Data Book)

Species listed in the 2007 UK Biodiversity Action Plan (BAP) are indicated by a double-dagger symbol (‡)—species so listed for research purposes only are also indicated with an asterisk (‡*).

See also
List of moths of Great Britain (overview)
Family lists: Hepialidae, Cossidae, Zygaenidae, Limacodidae, Sesiidae, Lasiocampidae, Saturniidae, Endromidae, Drepanidae, Thyatiridae, Geometridae, Sphingidae, Notodontidae, Thaumetopoeidae, Lymantriidae, Arctiidae, Ctenuchidae, Nolidae, Noctuidae and Micromoths

References 

 Waring, Paul, Martin Townsend and Richard Lewington (2003) Field Guide to the Moths of Great Britain and Ireland. British Wildlife Publishing, Hook, UK. .

Moths
Britain
Moths